George Sanna (born 15 March 1952) is an Australian equestrian. He competed at the 1984 Summer Olympics and the 1988 Summer Olympics. 

He is married to fellow Australian equestrian Rachael Sanna.

References

1952 births
Living people
Australian male equestrians
Olympic equestrians of Australia
Equestrians at the 1984 Summer Olympics
Equestrians at the 1988 Summer Olympics
Sportspeople from Perth, Western Australia